Mothership is a compilation album by English rock band Led Zeppelin, released by Atlantic Records and Rhino Entertainment on 12 November 2007 in the United Kingdom, and 13 November 2007 in the United States. It was released on the same day that Led Zeppelin's entire catalogue became available in digital stores, including the iTunes Store. The cover was designed by artist Shepard Fairey.

The songs included were chosen by the surviving members of Led Zeppelin, Robert Plant, Jimmy Page and John Paul Jones, and represent the band's eight studio albums. In addition to a two-disc set, the album is also available in both "deluxe" and "collector's" editions with a DVD featuring varied live content from the previously released Led Zeppelin DVD (2003). A 4-LP vinyl package was also released on 26 August 2008. On 6 November 2015, the album was reissued using the audio from the band's 2014–15 remaster campaign.

On 8 November 2007, a temporary XM Satellite Radio station, XM LED was made to promote the album.

Commercial performance

The album debuted at #4 in the UK Albums Chart, with 58,000 units sold, and debuted at #1 on the Official New Zealand Albums Chart and stayed there for several weeks. The album also debuted at #7 on the US Billboard 200 chart, selling about 136,000 copies in its first week. The album has sold over 2.1 million copies in the U.S and over 4.5 million copies worldwide, leading to it being certified 2× Platinum by the RIAA.

Track listing

CD

LP

Personnel
Led Zeppelin
John Bonham – drums, percussion
John Paul Jones – bass guitar, keyboards, mandolin, recorders
Jimmy Page – acoustic and electric guitars, production
Robert Plant – vocals, harmonica

Additional personnel
Dick Barnatt – photography
John C. F. Davis – remastering
Ian Dickson – photography
Carl Dunn – photography
Shepard Fairey – art direction, design
David Fricke – Liner notes
Peter Grant – executive production
Bob Gruen – photography
Ross Halfin – photo research
Neal Preston – photography
Christian Rose – inlay photography
Peter Simon – photography
Ian Stewart – piano on "Rock and Roll"
Laurens Van Houten – photography
Chris Walter – photography
Baron Wolman – photography
Neil Zlozower – photography

Charts

Weekly charts

Year-end charts

Certifications

Accolades

References

External links
Mothership promo
The Mother Ship Is Coming
Billboard.com announcement

2007 greatest hits albums
Albums produced by Jimmy Page
Led Zeppelin compilation albums
Atlantic Records compilation albums
Rhino Entertainment compilation albums
Folk rock compilation albums
Led Zeppelin video albums
Atlantic Records video albums
Rhino Entertainment video albums
Folk rock video albums
2007 video albums
Albums with cover art by Shepard Fairey